Ralston Creek is a stream in Johnson County, Iowa, in the United States. It is a tributary to the Iowa River.

Ralston Creek was named for Robert Ralston, a founder of Iowa City.

See also
List of rivers of Iowa

References

Rivers of Johnson County, Iowa
Rivers of Iowa